Latiya may refer to:

 Latiya (dessert), a cake from Guam
 Latiya (village), a village in Uttar Pradesh, India